The FIL World Luge Championships 1960 took place in Garmisch-Partenkirchen, West Germany. This was an extraordinary event because a luge track was not constructed for the 1960 Winter Olympics in Squaw Valley.

Men's singles

Women's singles

Doubles

Medal table

References
Doubles World Champions
Men's singles World Champions
Women's singles World Champions

FIL World Luge Championships
1960 in luge
1996 in German sport
Luge in Germany